István Burchard-Bélaváry (February 4, 1864, Mád, Zemplén County, Austrian Empire – October 21, 1933, Pestszentlőrinc, Budapest, Hungary) was a Hungarian painter.

Biography 
After schooling at Theresianum in Vienna, he turned to the arts. He lived eight years  from 1887 in United States. He participated in California in a humorous illustration of newspaper, "The Weekly Jonah" and then studied at the San Francisco Art Institute (1889-1890) and work independently. He painted still lifes, genre scenes, landscapes and portraits. He returned to Europe in 1894. His masters are Anton Ažbe in Munich (1895-1896) and Filippo Colarossi at the Académie Colarossi in Paris (1897-1898). He invented in 1899 a special technique: "Glycerin distemper." It sales its patent in 1907 to Reeves and Sons which reports the process in UK under the name "Bélaváry pasteloid colors". Then he makes a long stay in Italy and married in Florence in 1899.

He moved with his family to Pozsony in 1904. He led his own school of painting and was elected director of the Association of Fine Arts of Pozsony then director of the Salon of Pozsony in 1911. It organizes various exhibitions, including one in London in 1907. He moved to Budapest in 1918. He is active in Budapest and Debrecen.

He is the son of Gustave Burchard-Bélavary of Bélavar and Szikava (1829 Eperjes - 1903 Budapest), officer, professor of economics and commercial law, writer and painter, and Louise von Bukowski Stolzenburg († 1913). He married Enrica Coppini (1872-1960), painter.

Gallery

Bibliography 
Éber László, Művészeti Lexikon - Győző Andor Kiadása, Budapest, 1933
Akadémiai Kiadó, Művészeti Lexikon, Budapest, 1966
Dr. Szabó - Kállai, Magyar festők és grafikusok életrajzi lexikona, Nyíregyháza, 1997

Notes

External links 
Biographical notice with self-portrait(hu)
Biography (hu)

1864 births
1933 deaths
19th-century Hungarian painters
20th-century Hungarian painters
Académie Colarossi alumni
Artists from Budapest
People from Borsod-Abaúj-Zemplén County
Hungarian male painters
19th-century Hungarian male artists
20th-century Hungarian male artists